Paul Schacherer (born 16 January 2002) is a French football player who plays as a defender for Chambly B.

Club career 
After 4 years playing for Stade de Reims Youth Academy, Paul Schacherer moved to FC Chambly.

He made his professional debut with Chambly in a 1-0 Ligue 2 loss to Clermont on 13 February 2021.

References

External links

2002 births
Living people
French footballers
Association football defenders
FC Chambly Oise players
Ligue 2 players